George Ridding (16 March 1828 – 30 August 1904) was an English headmaster and bishop.

Life

George Ridding was born at Winchester College, of which his father, the Rev. Charles Ridding, vicar of Andover, was a fellow.

He was educated at Winchester College and at Balliol College, Oxford. He became a fellow of Exeter College and was a tutor from 1853 to 1863. In 1853 he married Mary Louisa Moberly, who died within a year of her marriage. Ordained Priest by Bishop of Oxford 20 September 1856 in St John Baptist Church, Oxford. He was appointed second master of Winchester College in 1863, and on the retirement of his father-in-law, George Moberly, he succeeded to the headmastership. The gate between College Meads and Lavender Meads bears his name.

During the tenure of this office (1867–1884) he carried out successfully a series of radical reforms in the organization of the school, resulting in a great increase both in its reputation and numbers. In 1884 he became the first Bishop of Southwell, and brought his powers of organization and conspicuous tact and moderation to bear on the management of the new diocese. There is a bronze statue of him in Southwell Minster by F. W. Pomeroy.

He took an active share in its educational and social work, and was materially assisted in these respects by his second wife, Lady Laura Palmer, daughter of the 1st Earl of Selborne. He resigned his see a short time before his death.

References

Sources

 
 Church Quarterly Review (July 1905).
  J.V. Beckett,  ‘Dr George Ridding: First Bishop of Southwell, 1884-1904’ in  Transactions of the Thoroton Society of Nottinghamshire, Vol. 116  (2012)
 
 

1828 births
1904 deaths
People educated at Winchester College
Alumni of Balliol College, Oxford
Fellows of Exeter College, Oxford
Bishops of Southwell
Headmasters of Winchester College
19th-century Church of England bishops
20th-century Church of England bishops